Pseudoconnarus is a genus of flowering plants belonging to the family Connaraceae.

Its native range is Southern Tropical America.

Species:

Pseudoconnarus agelaeoides 
Pseudoconnarus agelifolius 
Pseudoconnarus macrophyllus 
Pseudoconnarus rhynchosioides 
Pseudoconnarus subtriplinervis

References

Connaraceae
Oxalidales genera